Powell–Trollinger Lime Kilns is a set of three historic lime kilns located at Catawba, Catawba County, North Carolina. They were built about 1865, and are built into the side of a hill behind a solid stone wall, 20 to 30 feet high.  The kilns were located at the top through rock-lined, circular openings. The kilns operated into the 20th century.

It was listed on the National Register of Historic Places in 1974.

References

Industrial buildings and structures on the National Register of Historic Places in North Carolina
Industrial buildings completed in 1865
Buildings and structures in Catawba County, North Carolina
National Register of Historic Places in Catawba County, North Carolina
Lime kilns in the United States
1865 establishments in North Carolina